In Amenas is a district in Illizi Province, Algeria. It was named after its capital, In Amenas. As of the 2008 census it is the largest district in the province by area and second-largest by population (after Djanet District).

Municipalities
The district is further divided into 3 municipalities:
In Amenas
Bordj Omar Driss
Debdeb

References